María Camila Osorio Serrano (born 22 December 2001) is a Colombian professional tennis player. She has been ranked by the Women's Tennis Association (WTA) as high as world No. 33 in singles and No. 199 in doubles. She has won one singles title on the WTA Tour and three singles titles on tournaments of the ITF Women's Circuit.

Junior career
Junior Grand Slam results - Singles:
 Australian Open: –
 French Open: SF (2019)
 Wimbledon: 3R (2017)
 US Open: W (2019)

Junior Grand Slam results - Doubles:
 Australian Open: –
 French Open: QF (2017)
 Wimbledon: 2R (2017, 2019)
 US Open: QF (2018)
She won the girls' singles title at the 2019 US Open. In the final, she defeated Alexandra Yepifanova, losing only one game. On the ITF Junior Circuit, Osorio advanced to the world No. 1 in September 2019. At the 2018 Summer Youth Olympics, she won the bronze medal in girls' singles and a silver medal in mixed doubles, alongside Nicolás Mejía.

Professional career

2021: Maiden WTA title, top 100 & Grand Slam & WTA 1000 debuts, Major third round

In April 2021, while ranked world No. 180, Osorio won her first singles title at the Copa Colsanitas in her native Colombia, beating Tamara Zidanšek in the final. She followed up with a semifinal appearance at the Charleston Open the following week. In May, she reached her third straight clay-court semifinal at the Serbia Open, entering the top 100 as a result.

She came through the qualifying at the French Open to make her Grand Slam debut. However, she lost in the first round to Madison Brengle. 

In June, she again qualified for the main draw at the Wimbledon Championships. She reached the third round by defeating fellow-qualifier Anna Kalinskaya and 32nd seed Ekaterina Alexandrova before losing to second seed Aryna Sabalenka.

Osorio started at the US Open beating Ivana Jorović in the first round of the tournament, before losing to Ons Jabeur in the second.

Osorio completed her first professional season by reaching the final of the Tenerife Open, where she eventually lost to Ann Li. She later revealed in an interview that she sustained an abdominal injury which affected her in the final round of the tournament. Her success at the tournament saw her reach a new career high of No. 53 on 25 October 2021, finishing the season ranked No. 55.

2022: Australian Open debut, First Major & WTA 1000 wins, top 35
Osorio gained direct acceptance at the Monterrey Open. She reached her third WTA Tour-level singles final, losing to second seed and 2021 US Open runner-up, Leylah Fernandez, after having multiple match points.
She reached a career-high ranking of No. 33 on 4 April 2022.

2023: First Australian Open win
Osorio gained direct acceptance at the Lyon Open. She reached her first semifinal of the season where she defeated local and third seed of the tournament French Alize Cornet in the first round, German Jule Niemeier in the second round and Czech Linda Noskova in the quarterfinals. In the semifinal she lost to top seed French Caroline Garcia in straight sets.

Ranked No. 70 at the 2023 Monterrey Open, Osorio lost in the first round to Mayar Sherif after retiring in the second set. As a result of not being able to defend her points from the previous year final she fell 30 positions down to top 100 on 6 March 2023.

Personal life
She is the granddaughter of former Colombian national team football player Rolando Serrano.

Performance timelines

Only main-draw results in WTA Tour, Grand Slam tournaments, Fed Cup/Billie Jean King Cup and Olympic Games are included in win–loss records.

Singles
Current through the 2023 Monterrey Open.

Doubles

WTA career finals

Singles: 3 (1 title, 2 runner-up)

ITF Circuit finals

Singles: 6 (3 titles, 3 runner–ups)

Doubles: 3 (3 runner–ups)

Junior Grand Slam finals

Singles: 1 (title)

ITF Junior Circuit finals

Singles: 11 (8 titles, 3 runner–ups)

Doubles: 4 (3 titles, 1 runner–up)

Head-to-head records

Top-10 wins per season

Record against top 10 players
Osorio Serrano's record against players who have been ranked in the top 10. Active players are in boldface.

Regional championship medal matches

Summer Youth Olympics

Singles: (1–0)

Mixed doubles: (0–1)

Notes

References

External links
 
 
 

2001 births
Living people
Colombian female tennis players
People from Cúcuta
Tennis players at the 2018 Summer Youth Olympics
Grand Slam (tennis) champions in girls' singles
US Open (tennis) junior champions
Tennis players at the 2019 Pan American Games
Tennis players at the 2020 Summer Olympics
Central American and Caribbean Games medalists in tennis
Central American and Caribbean Games gold medalists for Colombia
Central American and Caribbean Games silver medalists for Colombia
Pan American Games competitors for Colombia
21st-century Colombian women